Notosuchia is a suborder of primarily Gondwanan mesoeucrocodylian crocodylomorphs that lived during the Jurassic and Cretaceous. Some phylogenies recover Sebecosuchia as a clade within Notosuchia, others as a sister group (see below); if Sebecosuchia is included within Notosuchia its existence is pushed into the Middle Miocene, about 11 million years ago. Fossils have been found from South America, Africa, Asia, and Europe. Notosuchia was a clade of terrestrial crocodilians that evolved a range of feeding behaviours, including herbivory (Chimaerasuchus), omnivory (Simosuchus), and terrestrial hypercarnivory (Baurusuchus). It included many members with highly derived traits unusual for crocodylomorphs, including mammal-like teeth, flexible bands of shield-like body armor similar to those of armadillos (Armadillosuchus), and possibly fleshy cheeks and pig-like snouts (Notosuchus). The suborder was first named in 1971 by Zulma Gasparini and has since undergone many phylogenetic revisions.

Description
Notosuchians were generally small, with slender bodies and erect limbs. The most distinctive characteristics are usually seen in the skull. Notosuchian skulls are generally short and deep. While most are relatively narrow, some are very broad. Simosuchus has a broadened skull and jaw that resembles a pug, while Anatosuchus has a broad, flat snout like that of a duck.

The teeth vary greatly between different genera. Many have heterodont dentitions that vary in shape across the jaw. Often, there are large canine-like teeth protruding from the front of the mouth and broader molar-like teeth in the back. Some genera, such as Yacarerani and Pakasuchus, have extremely mammal-like teeth. Their molars are complex and multicuspid, and are able to occlude or fit with one another. Some forms such as Malawisuchus had jaw joints that enabled them to move the jaw back and forth in a shearing motion rather than just up and down.

A derived group of notosuchians, the baurusuchids differ considerably from other forms. They are very large in comparison to other notosuchians and are exclusively carnivorous. Baurusuchids have deep skulls and prominent canine-like teeth.

Recent research found Araripesuchus wegeneri, Armadillosuchus arrudai, Baurusuchus, Iberosuchus macrodon, and Stratiotosuchus maxhechti were ectothermic organisms

Classification

Taxonomy

Genera
The evolutionary interrelationships of Notosuchia are in flux, but the following genera are generally considered notosuchians:

Phylogeny

The clade Notosuchia has undergone many recent phylogenetic revisions. In 2000, Notosuchia was proposed to be one of two groups within the clade Ziphosuchia, the other being Sebecosuchia, which included deep snouted forms such as baurusuchids and sebecids. The definition of Notosuchia by Sereno et al. (2001) is similar to that of Ziphosuchia as it includes within it Sebecosuchia. Pol (2003) also includes Sebecosuchia within Notosuchia. More recently, a phylogenetic analysis by Larsson and Sues (2007) resulted in the naming of a new clade, Sebecia, to include sebecids and peirosaurids. Baurusuchidae was considered to be polyphyletic in this study, with Pabwehshi being a basal member of Sebecia and Baurusuchus being the sister taxon to the clade containing Neosuchia and Sebecia. Thus, Sebecosuchia was no longer within Notosuchia and not considered to be a true clade, while Notosuchia was found to be a basal clade of Metasuchia.

The following cladogram simplified after the most comprehensive analysis of notosuchians as of 2014, presented by Pol et al. in 2014. It is based mainly on the data matrix published by Pol et al. (2012) which is itself a modified version of previous analyses. Thirty-one additional characters were added from other comprehensive analyses of notosuchians, e.g. Turner and Sertich (2010), Andrade et al. (2011), Montefeltro et al. (2011), Larsson and Sues (2007), and Novas et al. (2009), and 34 characters were noval, resulting in a matrix that includes 109 crocodyliforms and outgroup taxa which are scored based on 412 morphological traits.

This cladogram represents the results of the most comprehensive analysis of notosuchian relationships to date, performed in the description of Antaeusuchus taouzensis by Nicholl et al. 2021. It is largely based on the matrix from the above Pol et al. 2014 study, but also adding character scores from Leardi et al. 2015, Fiorelli et al. 2016, Leardi et al. 2018, and Martinez et al. 2018. The final matrix consisted of 121 taxa scored for 443 morphological traits.

References 

Early Cretaceous crocodylomorphs
Terrestrial crocodylomorphs
 
Bathonian first appearances
Maastrichtian extinctions
Miocene extinctions
Taxa named by Zulma Brandoni de Gasparini